The Nürnberg Rams are an American football team from Nuremberg (German: Nürnberg) Germany.

The original Nürnberg Rams club was formed in 1981 and renamed to Noris Rams in 1987. It played in the American football in the Bundesliga League, now the German Football League, from 1983 to 1998, reaching the play-off semifinals as its greatest success in 1987. The club became defunct in 1998 but was reformed in 2007.

History
The origins of the Nürnberg Rams go back to early 1981 when two players of the Ansbach Grizzlies began forming an American football team in Nuremberg. In September 1981 this team joined local sports club TSV 1846 Nürnberg and, in 1982 the Rams joined the 2. Bundesliga, the second tier of American football in Germany. The Rams won this league in its first season and earned promotion to the Bundesliga. The club spent the next sixteen seasons at this level, reaching the play-offs in all but two of those years.

The Rams qualified for the play-offs in their inaugural 1983 Bundesliga season but were knocked out in the quarterfinals, a fate the club would suffer in twelve of its fourteen play-off appearances. The second season saw the club struggle and nominally being relegated from the Bundesliga but eventually saved by the demise of the Frankfurter Löwen. After this season, from 1985 to 1997 the club would qualify for the play-offs each year. In 1986 the club split from TSV 1846 Nürnberg and joined ASN Pfeil Nürnberg instead, which forced a rename to Noris Rams for the following season as TSV retained the naming rights. The 1987 seasons saw the club's greatest success, reaching the semifinals of the play-off for the first and only time where it was knocked out by the Berlin Adler.

The following season the Rams were knocked out in the first round of the play-offs, the only year they did not advance to the quarterfinals. From 1989 to 1997 the Rams reached the quarterfinals each year and won the southern division title in 1989, 1991 and 1996 without ever reaching or even winning a German Bowl. The club's demise came after the 1998 season when the Rams did not win a game all season, were relegated and folded.

After a hiatus of nine years a new Nürnberg Rams club was formed in 2007 and entered the lowest level of competition, the Aufbauliga, in 2008. The new club won promotion in every season from 2008 to 2011 and quickly climbed the league pyramid from the sixth to the second tier. Since 2012 the club plays in the German Football League 2, the former 2. Bundesliga.

Honours
 GFL
 Southern Division champions: 1987, 1989, 1991, 1996
 League membership: (16) 1983–1998
 Play-off qualification: (14) 1983, 1985–1997
 German Junior Bowl
 Runners-up: 1985

Recent seasons
Recent seasons of the Rams:

 PR = Promotion round.
 QF = Quarterfinals.
 SF = Semifinals.
 GB = German Bowl.

References

External links
  Official Website
  German Football League official website
  Football History Historic American football tables from Germany

American football in Bavaria
German Football League teams
American football teams in Germany
American football teams established in 1981
1981 establishments in West Germany
1998 disestablishments in Germany
2007 establishments in Germany
Sport in Nuremberg